ET Solar is a solar cell manufacturer established in 2005. ET Solar provides a wide variety of PV modules.

Company history 
In 2005 ET Solar began producing solar panels. The company employs about 3000.

The PV industry professional media authority BNEF has rated ET Solar as Tier 1 solar panel manufacturer in the whole world since 2012.

After a merger and acquisition (M&A) in 2018, ET Solar becomes a government-owned company.

In 2018, ET Solar also gave the global PV market its new series of off-grid product and began ET Solar's new strategy—LIGHTING AFRICA, to develop the off-grid solar market in that continent.

Charitable activities 
In 2013, ET Solar officially partnered with UNICEF (United Nations International Children's Emergency Fund) and began contributing to UNICEF's Child Welfare Demonstration Project (CWDP).

References

External links
 

Solar energy companies of China
Manufacturing companies based in Nanjing
Chinese companies established in 2005
Energy companies established in 2005
Renewable resource companies established in 2005
Manufacturing companies established in 2005
Chinese brands